Refeeding syndrome is a metabolic disturbance that occurs as a result of reinstitution of nutrition in people and animals who are starved, severely malnourished, or metabolically stressed because of severe illness. When too much food or liquid nutrition supplement is eaten during the initial four to seven days following a malnutrition event, the production of glycogen, fat and protein in cells may cause low serum concentrations of potassium, magnesium and phosphate. Cardiac, pulmonary and neurological symptoms can be signs of refeeding syndrome. The low serum minerals, if severe enough, can be fatal.

Cause
Any individual who has had a negligible nutrient intake for many consecutive days and/or is metabolically stressed from a critical illness or major surgery is at risk of refeeding syndrome. Refeeding syndrome usually occurs within four days of starting to re-feed. Patients can develop fluid and electrolyte imbalance, especially hypophosphatemia, along with neurologic, pulmonary, cardiac, neuromuscular, and hematologic complications.

During fasting, the body switches its main fuel source from carbohydrates to fat tissue fatty acids and amino acids as the main energy sources. The spleen decreases its rate of red blood cell breakdown thus conserving red blood cells. Many intracellular minerals become severely depleted during this period, although serum levels remain normal. Importantly, insulin secretion is suppressed in this fasting state, and glucagon secretion is increased.

During refeeding, insulin secretion resumes in response to increased blood sugar, resulting in increased glycogen, fat, and protein synthesis. Refeeding increases the basal metabolic rate. The process requires phosphates, magnesium and potassium which are already depleted, and the stores rapidly become used up. Formation of phosphorylated carbohydrate compounds in the liver and skeletal muscle depletes intracellular ATP and 2,3-diphosphoglycerate in red blood cells, leading to cellular dysfunction and inadequate oxygen delivery to the body's organs. Intracellular movement of electrolytes occurs along with a fall in the serum electrolytes, including phosphate and magnesium. Levels of serum glucose may rise, and B1 vitamin thiamine may fall. Abnormal heart rhythms are the most common cause of death from refeeding syndrome, with other significant risks including confusion, coma and convulsions and cardiac failure.

Clinical situations
The syndrome can occur at the beginning of treatment for eating disorders when patients have an increase in calorie intake and can be fatal. It can also occur when someone does not eat for several days at a time usually beginning after 4-5 days with no food.  It can also occur after the onset of a severe illness or major surgery. The shifting of electrolytes and fluid balance increases cardiac workload and heart rate. This can lead to acute heart failure. Oxygen consumption is increased which strains the respiratory system and can make weaning from ventilation more difficult.

Diagnosis
Refeeding syndrome can be fatal if not recognized and treated properly. An awareness of the condition and a high index of suspicion are required in order to make the diagnosis. The electrolyte disturbances of the refeeding syndrome can occur within the first few days of refeeding.  Close monitoring of blood biochemistry is therefore necessary in the early refeeding period.

Treatment
In critically ill patients admitted to an intensive care unit, if phosphate drops to below 0.65 mmol/L (2.0 mg/dL) from a previously normal level within three days of starting enteral or parenteral nutrition, caloric intake should be reduced to 480 kcals per day for at least two days while electrolytes are replaced. Daily doses of thiamine, vitamin B complex (strong) and a multivitamin and mineral preparation are strongly recommended. Blood biochemistry should be monitored regularly until it is stable. Although clinical trials are lacking in patients other than those admitted to intensive care, it is commonly recommended that energy intake should remain lower than that normally required for the first 3–5 days of treatment of refeeding syndrome for all patients.

History
In his 5th century BC work 'On Fleshes' (De Carnibus), Hippocrates writes, "if a person goes seven days without eating or drinking anything, in this period most die; but there are some who survive that time but still die, and others are persuaded not to starve themselves to death but to eat and drink: however, the cavity no longer admits anything because the jejunum (nêstis) has grown together in that many days, and these people too die." Although Hippocrates misidentifies the cause of death, this passage likely represents an early description of refeeding syndrome. The Roman historian Flavius Josephus writing in the 1st century AD described classic symptoms of the syndrome among survivors of the siege of Jerusalem. He described the death of those who overindulged in food after the famine, whereas those who ate at a more restrained pace survived.

There were numerous cases of refeeding syndrome in the Siege of Leningrad during World War II, with Soviet civilians trapped in the city having becoming malnourished due to the German blockade.

A common error, repeated in multiple papers, is that "The syndrome was first described after World War II in Americans who, held by the Japanese as prisoners of war, had become malnourished during captivity and who were then released to the care of United States personnel in the Philippines."
However, closer inspection of the 1951 paper by Schnitker reveals the prisoners under study were not American POWs but Japanese soldiers who, already malnourished, surrendered in the Philippines during 1945, after the war was over.

Refeeding syndrome has also been documented among survivors of the Ebensee concentration camp upon their liberation by the United States Army in May 1945. After liberation, the inmates were fed rich soup; the stomachs of a few presumably could not handle the sudden caloric intake and digestion, and they died.

It is difficult to ascertain when the syndrome was first discovered and named, but it is likely the associated electrolyte disturbances were identified perhaps in Holland, the Netherlands during the closing months of World War II.

See also
 Minnesota Starvation Experiment

References

Bibliography
 Shils, M.E., Shike, M., Ross, A.C., Caballero, B. & Cousins, R.J.  (2006). Modern nutrition in health and disease, 10th ed. Lippincott, Williams & Wilkins. Baltimore, MD.
 Mahan, L.K. & Escott-Stump, S.E. (2004) Krause's Food, Nutrition, & Diet Therapy, 11th ed. Saunders, Philadelphia, PA.
 
 
 
 
 National Institute for Clinical Excellence (2008). CG32 Nutrition support in adults: full guideline. http://guidance.nice.org.uk/CG32/Guidance/pdf/English

External links 

Nutrition
Metabolic disorders
Intensive care medicine
Syndromes